Ternstroemia glomerata is a species of plant in the Pentaphylacaceae family. It is endemic to Jamaica.  It is threatened by habitat loss.

References

glomerata
Critically endangered plants
Endemic flora of Jamaica
Taxonomy articles created by Polbot